Don Lowry is a wargamer, businessman, illustrator, and game designer who is best known as the publisher of Chainmail and the editor of Panzerfaust Magazine.

Lowry was active in the International Federation of Wargaming in the late 1960s and ran a mail order business called "Lowry's Hobbies" with his wife Julie.  In 1970 he produced a supplement to the Avalon Hill game Battle of the Bulge called Operation Greif which was distributed via the IFW newsletter. In 1971 he started a publishing imprint called Guidon Games which produced rulebooks for miniature wargaming and board wargames, and he tapped Gary Gygax to serve as editor.  Lowry designed two of the games, Ironclad and Atlanta, himself and provided the illustrations for some of the other games.

Lowry's mail order business was originally in Evansville, Indiana, but he relocated to Belfast, Maine in 1972.  The same year he acquired Panzerfaust Magazine from Don Greenwood and took over as editor.  Lowry declined to publish Dungeons & Dragons, which motivated Gygax to found TSR, Inc.  TSR would republish some of the Guidon titles, and the Guidon board game Alexander the Great was picked up by Avalon Hill.

By 1975 Lowry moved his company, now called "Lowry's Enterprises", to Fallbrook, California.  That year he designed a set of rules for Napoleonic miniatures called Grand Army and released it under his Panzerfaust Publications imprint.  Panzerfaust magazine was renamed Campaign in 1976, and Lowry published it as late as 1982.

He holds, or has held, the copyrights to Alexander the Great, Chainmail: rules for medieval miniatures, and Dunkirk, the Battle of France, all with Gary Gygax.

References 

Board game designers
Living people
People from Evansville, Indiana
People from Belfast, Maine
People from Fallbrook, California
Year of birth missing (living people)